Christian Vanneste (born 14 July 1947) is a French politician. He served two terms as a deputy in the French Parliament (2002-2012), representing the Union for a Popular Movement (UMP).

Career 
A member of the French Parliament, he was elected in the 10th constituency of Nord. He sat with the parliamentary group of the Union for a Popular Movement (UMP).

In 2005/2006, he reported on the controversial DADVSI copyright bill.

He was beaten in the first round of the June 2012 legislative elections.

Controversy 
In January 2006, Vanneste became the first French citizen to be fined €3,000 (in the first instance, but later relaxed) for his homophobic remarks. During a debate in the National Assembly of France, and afterwards in the media, he declared homosexual behavior a threat to the survival of humanity, and "morally inferior" to heterosexuality. The judgement, after a refused appeal, was eventually cancelled by the Cour de cassation on 12 November 2008.

In 2012, Vanneste again encountered controversy after referring to the deportation from France of homosexuals in the Holocaust as a "famous legend", though he acknowledges that they were persecuted in other parts of the Reich. Vanneste may or may not face Holocaust denial charges for the comment. 
He nevertheless received the support of Serge Klarsfeld the famous French "nazi-hunter". Dominique de Villepin, the former French Prime Minister also admitted that "on historical grounds", his comments were true.

He belongs to the Club de l'horloge (today Carrefour de l'horloge).

References

External links
Webpage at the Assemblée Nationale website (in French)
Official blog (in French)

1947 births
Living people
Carrefour de l'horloge people
Politicians from Hauts-de-France
People from Tourcoing
Rally for the Republic politicians
National Centre of Independents and Peasants politicians
Union for a Popular Movement politicians
The Popular Right
Deputies of the 12th National Assembly of the French Fifth Republic
Deputies of the 13th National Assembly of the French Fifth Republic